is an underground metro station located in Naka-ku, Nagoya, Aichi Prefecture, Japan operated by the Nagoya Municipal Subway. The station is an interchange station between the Tsurumai Line and the Sakura-dōri Line, and is located 6.3 rail kilometers from the terminus of the Tsurumai Line at Kami-Otai Station and 2.4 rail kilometers from the terminus of the Sakuradōri Line at Nakamura Kuyakusho Station.

This station provides access to Aichi Prefectural Library, the headquarters of Chunichi Shimbun, the Brazilian consulate in Nagoya, and the Nagoya branch offices of various companies.

History
Marunouchi Station was opened on 27 November 1981 as a station on the Tsurumai Line. The Sakura-dōri Line connected to the station on 10 September 1989. Platform screen doors were installed on the Sakura-dōri Line platform on 5 March 2011.

Lines

 (Station number: T06)
 (Station number: S04)

Layout
Marunouchi Station has two underground island platforms. The Sakura-dōri Line platform, at a depth of 24 meters, is the deepest subway platform in Nagoya.

Platforms

On Platform 1, door 1 is closest to the connecting passage to the Sakuradōri Line platform and door 16 is closest to the elevator, and on Platform 2, door 9 is closest to the elevator and door 24 is closest to the connecting passage.  On the platforms for the Sakuradōri Line, on Platform 3 for Akaike door 8 is closest to the elevator and the connecting passage is behind the train, beyond door 20, and on Platform 4 for Nagoya, door 17 is closest to the elevator and door 1 is closest to the connecting passage.  There are two wickets, the East Wicket for the Sakuradōri Line portion of the station and the North Wicket for the Tsurumai Line portion.

References

External links

 Marunouchi Station official web site 

Railway stations in Japan opened in 1981
Railway stations in Aichi Prefecture